Tha Phra station is an MRT Blue Line station, located at Tha Phra Intersection, Bangkok Yai District, Bangkok. It is the self-interchange station of MRT Blue Line and a terminal station.

The station was opened in two stages. First stage was opened on 29 July 2019, consisting of a concourse and lower platform for the Hua Lamphong - Lak Song extension. The upper platform was opened on 23 December 2019.

Station layout 
Tha Phra Station is an elevated self-interchange station. The station has side platforms on the lower floor and island platform on the upper floor.

Floor 

 U3 Upper Platform
 U2 Lower Platform
 U1 Ticket hall and station concourse
Street level Station entrance

Services

Upper Platform 
Platform 3, 4 for service to Charan 13 and Lak Song (via Bang Sue)

Lower Platform 
Platform 1 for service to Lak Song

Platform 2 for service to Itsaraphap and Tha Phra (via Bang Sue)

Gallery

References

External links 
 Progress of construction by month

MRT (Bangkok) stations